Kamran Shakhsuvarly (born 6 December 1992) is an Azerbaijani boxer. He competed in the men's middleweight event at the 2016 Summer Olympics.

References

1992 births
Living people
Azerbaijani male boxers
Olympic boxers of Azerbaijan
Boxers at the 2016 Summer Olympics
Place of birth missing (living people)
Medalists at the 2016 Summer Olympics
Olympic medalists in boxing
Olympic bronze medalists for Azerbaijan
AIBA World Boxing Championships medalists
European Games competitors for Azerbaijan
Boxers at the 2019 European Games
Middleweight boxers
Islamic Solidarity Games medalists in boxing
21st-century Azerbaijani people